Reinado Internacional del Café 2006, was held in Manizales, Colombia, on January 10, 2006. 22 contestants attended the event. The winner was Alice Panikian, from Canada.

Results

References

External links
 Instituto de Cultura y Turismo de Manizales
 Alcaldía de Manizales
 REINADO INTERNACIONAL DEL CAFE
http://www.bellezavenezolana.net/news/2006/enero/20060111.htm

2006
2006 beauty pageants
2006 in Colombia